Unipiha is a village in Nõo Parish, Tartu County in eastern Estonia.

References

 

Villages in Tartu County
Kreis Dorpat